Uttara Kannada Lok Sabha constituency (formerly known as Canara Lok Sabha constituency) is one of the 28 Lok Sabha constituencies in Karnataka state in southern India. Following the delimitation of parliamentary constituencies in 2008, the constituency was renamed, Ankola legislative assembly segment was abolished and a new legislative assembly segment, Yellapur came into existence.

Assembly segments
There are 8 assembly segments under the Uttar Kannada (North Kannada) Lok Sabha seat

Members of Parliament

Election Results

2019 Lok Sabha Election

2014 Lok Sabha Election

See also
 List of Constituencies of the Lok Sabha

References

Lok Sabha constituencies in Karnataka
Uttara Kannada district